KRSY (1230 kHz, "Alamo Sports and Talk") is an AM radio station broadcasting a talk/sports format. Licensed to Alamogordo, New Mexico, United States, the station is currently owned by Exciter Media , LLC and features programming from Citadel Media, ESPN Radio and Premiere Radio Networks.

References

External links

RSY
Talk radio stations in the United States
Sports radio stations in the United States